Passport to Your National Parks is a program through which ink stamps can be acquired at no cost at park visitor centers and ranger stations at nearly all of the  units of the United States National Park System and most of the National Park Service's affiliated areas. The program is run by Eastern National, a non-profit organization that operates bookstores in many park locations.

The ink stamps applied with a rubber stamp are similar in nature to passport stamps stamped in a traveler's national passport and serve as a record of each park visit. Eastern National has described the stamps as cancellations, but this is incorrect as a cancellation is a mark that cancels the validity of a postage stamp, while these mark a record of visitation like a passport stamp and denote a place and date like a postmark and do not cancel anything. Collectors of the stamps have formed a non-profit social club, the National Park Travelers Club, a group which holds annual conventions.

Passport books
Passport books, sold at Eastern National park stores and online, provide a place for park visitors to collect National Park passport stamps. Over 1.3 million Passport books have been sold.  The 3.25" × 5.5" passport book provides five pages for each of the nine regions where the passport user can place ink stamps and can affix one featured stamp per page. A featured stamp collector's passport would therefore be filled after five years of use as long as the featured stamps were added to the book each year.  In 2006, for the program's 20th anniversary, the Passport Explorer was released, featuring a binder and larger pages.  Due to its binder format, the Passport Explorer allows the user to easily add extra pages for additional stamps and featured stamps.

National Park Passport Regions

The National Park Service is administratively divided into regions. Each region provides oversight and guidance to the park units within its geographic area.  While the NPS currently divides the various parks, monuments, and other units among seven regions, the passport booklet organizes parks into the nine regions in effect when the program was established.

Annual stamp series
In addition to the stamps, each year the Passport to Your National Parks program releases a set of ten full-color collector sticker stamps featuring a photo and description of one park per region. Passport holders can affix these adhesive stamps to their Passport book in a designated space below which they can stamp the corresponding ink stamp. The Park units featured on the stamp sets change each year.

The stamp sets, dating back to their inception in 1986, are still readily available at most park gift shops for under $10, or on the internet through Eastern National.

Originally, the featured stamps were only available in the region they represented, save for Colonial National Historical Park, where Eastern National was headquartered.  In 1986 the stamps were printed on thin cardboard, which distorted the passbook due to the combined thickness of the cardboard.  Each stamp would be mounted onto its respective page with a lightweight, black, adhesive-backed plastic sleeve.  Since 1987, the annual stamp series have been printed on a single sheet of adhesive-backed glossy paper, of a quality similar to that of conventional postage stamps.

Featured stamps

References

External links
 
 National Park Travelers Club

National parks of the United States
Memorabilia